Hulagu Khan, also known as Hülegü or Hulegu (Arabic:  , Holâku Khân;  ;  8 February 1265), was a Mongol ruler who conquered much of Western Asia. Son of Tolui and the Keraite princess Sorghaghtani Beki, he was a grandson of Genghis Khan and brother of Ariq Böke, Möngke Khan, and Kublai Khan.

Hulagu's army greatly expanded the southwestern portion of the Mongol Empire, founding the Ilkhanate of Persia, a precursor to the eventual Safavid dynasty, and then the modern state of Iran. Under Hulagu's leadership, the siege of Baghdad (1258) destroyed Baghdad's standing in the Islamic Golden Age and weakened Damascus, causing a shift of Islamic influence to the Mamluk Sultanate in Cairo and ended the Abbasid Dynasty.

Background 

Hulagu was born to Tolui, one of Genghis Khan's sons, and Sorghaghtani Beki, an influential Keraite princess and a niece of Toghrul in 1217. Nothing much is known of Hulagu's childhood except of an anecdote given in Jami' al-Tawarikh and he once met his grandfather Genghis Khan with Kublai in 1224.

Military campaigns 

Hulagu's brother Möngke Khan had been installed as Great Khan in 1251. Möngke charged Hulagu with leading a massive Mongol army to conquer or destroy the remaining Muslim states in southwestern Asia. Hulagu's campaign sought the subjugation of the Lurs of southern Iran, the destruction of the Nizari Ismaili state (the Assassins), the submission or destruction of the Abbasid Caliphate in Baghdad, the submission or destruction of the Ayyubid states in Syria based in Damascus, and finally, the submission or destruction of the Bahri Mamluke Sultanate of Egypt. Möngke ordered Hulagu to treat kindly those who submitted and utterly destroy those who did not. Hulagu vigorously carried out the latter part of these instructions.

Hulagu marched out with perhaps the largest Mongol army ever assembled – by order of Möngke, two-tenths of the empire's fighting men were gathered for Hulagu's army in 1253. He arrived at Transoxiana in 1255. He easily destroyed the Lurs, and the Assassins surrendered their impregnable fortress of Alamut without a fight, accepting a deal that spared the lives of their people in early 1256.

Hulagu Khan chose Azerbaijan as his power base, while ordering Baiju to retreat to Anatolia.

Siege of Baghdad 

Hulagu's Mongol army set out for Baghdad in November 1257. Once near the city he divided his forces to threaten the city on both the east and west banks of the Tigris. Hulagu demanded surrender, but the caliph, Al-Musta'sim, refused. Due to the treason of Abu Alquma, an advisor to Al-Muta'sim, an uprising in the Baghdad army took place and Siege of Baghdad began. The attacking Mongols broke dikes and flooded the ground behind the caliph's army, trapping them. Much of the army was slaughtered or drowned.

The Mongols under Chinese general Guo Kan laid siege to the city on January 29, 1258, constructing a palisade and a ditch and wheeling up siege engines and catapults. The battle was short by siege standards. By February 5 the Mongols controlled a stretch of the wall. The caliph tried to negotiate but was refused. On February 10 Baghdad surrendered. The Mongols swept into the city on February 13 and began a week of destruction. The Grand Library of Baghdad, containing countless precious historical documents and books on subjects ranging from medicine to astronomy, was destroyed. Citizens attempted to flee but were intercepted by Mongol soldiers.

Death counts vary widely and cannot be easily substantiated: A low estimate is about 90,000 dead; higher estimates range from 200,000 to a million. The Mongols looted and then destroyed. Mosques, palaces, libraries, hospitals—grand buildings that had been the work of generations—were burned to the ground. The caliph was captured and forced to watch as his citizens were murdered and his treasury plundered. Il Milione, a book on the travels of Venetian merchant Marco Polo, states that Hulagu starved the caliph to death, but there is no corroborating evidence for that. Most historians believe the Mongol and Muslim accounts that the caliph was rolled up in a rug and the Mongols rode their horses over him, as they believed that the earth would be offended if touched by royal blood. All but one of his sons were killed. Baghdad was a depopulated, ruined city for several centuries. Smaller states in the region hastened to reassure Hulagu of their loyalty, and the Mongols turned to Syria in 1259, conquering the Ayyubid dynasty and sending advance patrols as far ahead as Gaza.

A thousand squads of northern Chinese sappers accompanied the Mongol Khan Hulagu during his conquest of the Middle East.

Conquest of Syria (1260) 

In 1260 Mongol forces combined with those of their Christian vassals in the region, including the army of the Armenian Kingdom of Cilicia under Hethum I, King of Armenia and the Franks of Bohemond VI of Antioch. This force conquered Muslim Syria, a domain of the Ayyubid dynasty. They captured Aleppo by siege and, under the Christian general Kitbuqa, seized Damascus on March 1, 1260. A Christian Mass was celebrated in the Umayyad Mosque and numerous mosques were profaned. Many historical accounts describe the three Christian rulers Hethum, Bohemond, and Kitbuqa entering the city of Damascus together in triumph, though some modern historians such as David Morgan have questioned this story as apocryphal.

The invasion effectively destroyed the Ayyubids, which was until then a powerful dynasty that had ruled large parts of the Levant, Egypt, and the Arabian Peninsula. The last Ayyubid king, An-Nasir Yusuf, had been killed by Hulagu this same year. With Baghdad ravaged and Damascus weakened, the center of Islamic power shifted to the Mamluk sultan's capital of Cairo.

Hulagu intended to send forces southward through Palestine toward Cairo. So he had a threatening letter delivered by an envoy to the Mamluk Sultan Qutuz in Cairo demanding that Qutuz open his city or it would be destroyed like Baghdad. Then, because food and fodder in Syria had become insufficient to supply his full force, and because it was a regular Mongol practice to move troops to the cooler highlands for the summer, Hulagu withdrew his main force to Iran near Azerbaijan, leaving behind two tumens (20,000 men) under Kitbuqa, which Hulagu considered sufficient. Hulagu then personally departed for Mongolia to play his role in the imperial succession conflict occasioned by the death some eight months earlier of Great Khan Möngke. But upon receiving news of how few Mongols now remained in the region, Qutuz quickly assembled his well-trained and equipped 12,000-strong army at Cairo and invaded Palestine. He then allied himself with a fellow Mamluk leader, Baybars in Syria, who not only needed to protect his own future from the Mongols but was eager to avenge for Islam the Mongol capture of Damascus, looting of Baghdad, and conquest of Syria.

The Mongols, for their part, attempted to form a Frankish-Mongol alliance with (or at least, demand the submission of) the remnant of the Crusader Kingdom of Jerusalem, now centered on Acre, but Pope Alexander IV had forbidden such an alliance. Tensions between Franks and Mongols also increased when Julian of Sidon caused an incident resulting in the death of one of Kitbuqa's grandsons. Angered, Kitbuqa had sacked Sidon. The Barons of Acre, contacted by the Mongols, had also been approached by the Mamluks, seeking military assistance against the Mongols. Although the Mamluks were traditional enemies of the Franks, the Barons of Acre recognized the Mongols as the more immediate menace. Instead of taking sides, the Crusaders opted for a position of cautious neutrality between the two forces. In an unusual move, however, they allowed the Egyptian Mamluks to march northward without hindrance through Crusader territory and even let them camp near Acre to resupply.

Battle of Ain Jalut

When news arrived that the Mongols had crossed the Jordan River in 1260, Sultan Qutuz and his forces proceeded southeast toward the 'Spring of Goliath' (Known in Arabic as 'Ain Jalut') in the Jezreel Valley. They met the Mongol army of about 20,000 in the Battle of Ain Jalut and fought relentlessly for many hours. The Mamluk leader Baybars mostly implemented hit-and-run tactics in an attempt to lure the Mongol forces into chasing him. Baybars and Qutuz had hidden the bulk of their forces in the hills to wait in ambush for the Mongols to come into range. The Mongol leader Kitbuqa, already provoked by the constant fleeing of Baybars and his troops, decided to march forwards with all his troops on the trail of the fleeing Egyptians. When the Mongols reached the highlands, Egyptians appeared from hiding, and the Mongols found themselves surrounded by enemy forces as the hidden troops hit them from the sides and Qutuz attacked the Mongol rear. Estimates of the size of the Egyptian army range from 24,000 to 120,000. The Mongols broke free of the trap and even mounted a temporarily successful counterattack, but their numbers had been depleted to the point that the outcome was inevitable. Almost the whole Mongol army that had remained in the region, including Kitbuqa, were either killed or captured that day. The battle of Ain Jalut established a high-water mark for the Mongol conquest.

Civil War 

After the succession was settled and his brother Kublai Khan was established as Great Khan,
Hulagu returned to his lands by 1262. When he massed his armies to attack the Mamluks and avenge the defeat at Ain Jalut, however, he was instead drawn into civil war with Batu Khan's brother Berke. Berke Khan, a Muslim convert and the grandson of Genghis Khan, had promised retribution in his rage after Hulagu's sack of Baghdad and allied himself with the Mamluks. He initiated a large series of raids on Hulagu's territories, led by Nogai Khan. Hulagu suffered a severe defeat in an attempted invasion north of the Caucasus in 1263. This was the first open war between Mongols and signaled the end of the unified empire. In retaliation for his failure, Hulagu killed Berke's ortogh, and Berke did the same in return.

Even while Berke was Muslim, out of Mongol brotherhood he at first resisted the idea of fighting Hulagu. He said, "Mongols are killed by Mongol swords. If we were united, then we would have conquered all of the world." But the economic situation of the Golden Horde due to the actions of the Ilkhanate led him to declare jihad because the Ilkhanids were hogging the wealth of North Iran and because of the Ilkhanate's demands for the Golden Horde not to sell slaves to the Mamluks.

Communications with Europe 
Hulagu's mother Sorghaghtani successfully navigated Mongol politics, arranging for all of her sons to become Mongol leaders. She was a Christian of the Church of the East (often referred to as "Nestorianism") and Hulagu was friendly to Christianity. Hulagu's favorite wife, Doquz Khatun, was also a Christian, as was his closest friend and general, Kitbuqa. Hulagu sent multiple communications to Europe in an attempt to establish a Franco-Mongol alliance against the Muslims. In 1262, he sent his secretary Rychaldus and an embassy to "all kings and princes overseas". The embassy was apparently intercepted in Sicily by Manfred, King of Sicily, who was allied with the Mamluk Sultanate and in conflict with Pope Urban IV, and Rychaldus was returned by ship.

On April 10, 1262, Hulagu sent a letter, through John the Hungarian, to Louis IX of France, offering an alliance. It is unclear whether the letter ever reached Louis IX in Paris — the only manuscript known to have survived was in Vienna, Austria. The letter stated Hulagu's intention to capture Jerusalem for the benefit of the Pope and asked for Louis to send a fleet against Egypt:

Despite many attempts, neither Hulagu nor his successors were able to form an alliance with Europe, although Mongol culture in the West was in vogue in the 13th century. Many new-born children in Italy were named after Mongol rulers, including Hulagu: names such as Can Grande ("Great Khan"), Alaone (Hulagu), Argone (Arghun), and Cassano (Ghazan) are recorded.

Family 
Hulagu had fourteen wives and concubines with at least 21 issues with them:

Principal wives:
 Guyuk Khatun (died in Mongolia before reaching Iran) — daughter of Toralchi Güregen of the Oirat tribe and Checheikhen Khatun
Jumghur (died en route to Iran in 1270s) 
Bulughan agha — married Jorma Güregen, son of Jochi (from Tatar tribe, brother of Nukdan khatun) and Chechagan Khatun, daughter of Temüge (Otchi Noyon)
 Qutui Khatun — daughter of Chigu Noyan of Khongirad tribe and Tümelün behi (daughter of Genghis khan and Börte)
Takshin (d. 12 September 1270 of urinary incontinence)
Tekuder (1246-1284)
Todogaj Khatun — married to Tengiz Güregen, married secondly to Sulamish his son, married thirdly to Chichak, son of Sulamish
 Yesunchin Khatun (d. January/February 1272) — a lady from the Suldus tribe
Abaqa (1234-1282)
Dokuz Khatun, daughter of Uyku (son of Toghrul) and widow of Tolui
 Öljei Khatun — half-sister of Guyuk, daughter of Toralchi Güregen of the Oirat tribe
Möngke Temür (b. 23 October 1256, d. 26 April 1282)
Jamai Khatun — married Jorma Güregen after her sister Bulughan's death
Manggugan Khatun — married firstly to her cousin Chakar Güregen (son of Buqa Timur and niece of Öljei Khatun), married secondly to his son Taraghai
Baba Khatun — married to Lagzi Güregen, son of Arghun Aqa

Concubines:

 Nogachin Aghchi, a lady from Cathay; from camp of Qutui Khatun
Yoshmut — Viceroy of Arran and Shirvan
Tubshin — Viceroy of Khorasan during Abaqa's reign
Tuqtani (or Toqiyatai) Egechi (d. 20 February 1292) — sister of Irinjin, niece of Dokuz Khatun
 Boraqchin Agachi, from camp of Qutui Khatun
Taraghai (died by lightning strike on his way to Iran in 1260s)
Baydu
Eshil — married to Tuq Temür and then his brother (son of Abdullah Aqa, a general of Abaqa)
 Arighan Agachi (d. 8 February 1265) — daughter of Tengiz Güregen; from camp of Qutui Khatun
Ajai (d. February 1265) — Viceroy of Anatolia during reign of Abaqa and of Georgia during reign of Arghun
Ildar (executed by Ghazan in 1296)
 Ajuja Agachi, a lady from China or Khitans, from camp of Dokuz Khatun
Qonqurtai (executed on 18 January 1284 by Tekuder)
 Yeshichin Agachi, a lady from the Kür'lüüt tribe; from camp of Qutui Khatun
Yesüder — Viceroy of Khorasan during Abaqa's reign
A daughter (married to Esen Buqa Güregen, son of Noqai Yarghuchi)
Khabash — posthumous son
 El Agachi — a lady from the Khongirad tribe; from camp of Dokuz Khatun
Hulachu (executed by Arghun in October 1289)
Suleiman (executed with his father)
Kuchuk (died in infancy after a long illness)
Khoja (died in infancy)
Qutluq Buqa (died in infancy)
3 daughter
Shiba'uchi (d. Winter 1282)
 Irqan Agachi (Tribe unknown)
Taraghai Khatun — married to Taghai Timur (renamed Musa) of Khongirad (son of Shigu Güregen) and Temülun Khatun (daughter of Genghis Khan)
 Mangligach Agachi (Tribe unknown)
Qutluqqan Khatun — married firstly to Yesu Buqa Güregen, son of Urughtu Noyan of the Dörben tribe, married secondly Tukel, son of Yesu Buqa
A concubine from Qutui Khatun's camp:
Toqai Timur (d. 1289)
Qurumushi
Hajji

Death 
Hulagu Khan fell seriously ill in January 1265 and died the following month on the banks of Zarrineh River (then called Jaghatu) and was buried on Shahi Island in Lake Urmia. His funeral was the only Ilkhanate funeral to feature human sacrifice. His tomb has never been found.

Legacy 
Hulagu Khan laid the foundations of the Ilkhanate and thus paved the way for the later Safavid dynastic state, and ultimately the modern country of Iran. Hulagu's conquests also opened Iran to both European influence from the west and Chinese influence from the east. This, combined with patronage from his successors, would develop Iran's distinctive excellence in architecture. Under Hulagu's dynasty, Iranian historians began writing in Persian rather than Arabic. It is recorded however that he converted to Buddhism as he neared death, against the will of Doquz Khatun. The erection of a Buddhist temple at Ḵoy testifies his interest in that religion. Recent translations of various Tibetan monks' letters and epistles to Hulagu confirms that he was a lifelong Buddhist, following the Kagyu school.

Hulagu also patronized Nasir al-Din Tusi and his researches in Maragheh observatory. Another of his proteges were Juvayni brothers Ata Malik and Shams al-Din Juvayni. His reign as the ruler of Ilkhanate was peaceful and tolerant to diversity.

In popular media 
 Portrayed by Kurt Katch in Ali Baba and the Forty Thieves (1944)
 Portrayed by Pran in the 1956 Indian film Halaku.
 Portrayed by Öztürk Serengil in Cengiz Han'ın Hazineleri (1962)
 Portrayed by Zhang Jingda and Zhang Bolun in The Legend of Kublai Khan (2013)

Notes

References

Works cited
 Atwood, Christopher P. (2004). The Encyclopedia of Mongolia and the Mongol Empire. Facts on File, Inc. .
 Boyle, J.A., (Editor). The Cambridge History of Iran: Volume 5, The Saljuq and Mongol Periods. Cambridge University Press; Reissue edition (January 1, 1968). .
 
 Morgan, David. The Mongols. Blackwell Publishers; Reprint edition, April 1990. . Best for an overview of the wider context of medieval Mongol history and culture.
 
 
 Robinson, Francis. The Mughal Emperors And the Islamic Dynasties of India, Iran and Central Asia. Thames and Hudson Limited; 2007.

External links 
 A long article about Hulagu's conquest of Baghdad, written by Ian Frazier, appeared in the April 25, 2005 issue of The New Yorker.
 An Osama bin Laden tape in which Osama bin Laden compares Vice President Dick Cheney and Secretary of State Colin Powell to Hulagu and his attack on Baghdad. Dated November 12, 2002.
 Hulegu the Mongol, by Nicolas Kinloch, published in History Today, Volume 67 Issue 6 June 2017.

 
1210s births
1265 deaths
13th-century Buddhists
Il-Khan emperors
13th-century monarchs in Asia
Kerait people
Mongolian Buddhist monarchs

Year of birth uncertain